Semyon Yuryevich Radostev (born 17 January 2000) is a Russian football player. He plays for FC Sakhalinets Moscow.

Club career
He made his debut in the Russian Professional Football League for FC Chertanovo-2 Moscow on 18 July 2018 in a game against FC Murom.

He made his Russian Football National League debut for FC Chertanovo Moscow on 10 November 2018 in a game against FC Armavir.

References

External links
 Profile by Russian National Football League
 

2000 births
Sportspeople from Perm, Russia
Living people
Russian footballers
Russia youth international footballers
Association football midfielders
FC Chertanovo Moscow players
FC Saturn Ramenskoye players
FC Tom Tomsk players
FC Salyut Belgorod players
Russian First League players
Russian Second League players